Aftermath or Burning Border is a 1927 German silent film directed by Erich Waschneck and starring Jenny Hasselqvist, Hubert von Meyerinck and Fritz Alberti. It is noted for its generally anti-Polish tone.

It was made at the Terra Studios in Berlin in late 1926. The film's sets were designed by the art director Alfred Junge.

The film is set along the disputed German-Polish borderland after the First World War where clashes between the two sides threaten to lead to bloodshed. The estate of a young widow is threatened when a local Polish commissioner leads his forces to occupy it.

Plot summary

Cast
 Jenny Hasselqvist as Die junge Gutsherrin
 Hubert von Meyerinck as Heino
 Fritz Alberti as government commissioner
 Hans Adalbert Schlettow as Freischarenführer
 Olga Tschechowa as Nadja
 Camilla Spira as Marlene - economist
 Hugo Werner-Kahle as Duban - Freischarenführer's adjutant
 Albert Steinrück as Der Gutsvogt
 Gustav Trautschold as old servant
 Oskar Homolka as sailor
 Wilhelm Diegelmann as tavern host
 Frigga Braut as Die dralle maid
 Max Maximilian as cow servant
 Hildegard Imhof

References

External links
 
 

Films of the Weimar Republic
Films directed by Erich Waschneck
German silent feature films
Films set in Poland
National Film films
German black-and-white films